Mark Edward Kelly (born February 21, 1964) is an American politician, former astronaut, and United States Navy captain who has served as the junior United States senator from Arizona since 2020. A member of the Democratic Party, he was elected in the special election held following the death of Senator John McCain, defeating incumbent Republican Martha McSally.

Kelly flew combat missions during the Gulf War as a naval aviator before being selected as a NASA Space Shuttle pilot in 1996. He flew his first space mission in 2001 as pilot of STS-108, piloted STS-121 in 2006, and commanded STS-124 in 2008 and STS-134 in 2011, the final mission of Space Shuttle Endeavour. His identical twin, Scott Kelly, is also a retired astronaut; they are the only siblings to have both traveled into orbit.

Kelly's wife, then-Arizona Congresswoman Gabby Giffords, was shot and nearly killed in an assassination attempt on January 8, 2011. Six people died in the Tucson shooting. After the Sandy Hook Elementary School shooting the following year, Giffords and Kelly founded the nonprofit Americans for Responsible Solutions, later renamed Giffords, which campaigns for gun control measures like universal background checks and red flag laws.

Kelly announced his candidacy for Arizona's Class 3 U.S. Senate seat in the 2020 special election on February 12, 2019. He won the Democratic primary on August 4, 2020, and defeated incumbent Republican Martha McSally in the November 3, 2020, general election, becoming the first Democrat to win this seat since 1962. Kelly was sworn in on December 2, 2020. In 2022, he was elected to a full term in office, defeating Republican challenger Blake Masters.

Early life and education
Kelly and twin brother Scott Kelly are the sons of Richard and Patricia (née McAvoy) Kelly, two retired police officers. He is of Irish descent. He was born on February 21, 1964, in Orange, New Jersey, and raised in West Orange, New Jersey. Kelly graduated from Mountain High School in 1982. He received a Bachelor of Science in marine engineering and nautical science from the United States Merchant Marine Academy, graduating with highest honors in 1986. In 1994, he received a Master of Science in aeronautical engineering from the U.S. Naval Postgraduate School.

Naval career
In December 1987, Kelly became a naval aviator and received initial training on the A-6E Intruder attack aircraft. He was then assigned to Attack Squadron 115 (VA-115) in Atsugi, Japan, and made two deployments to the Persian Gulf on the aircraft carrier , flying 39 combat missions in Operation Desert Storm. After receiving his master's degree, Kelly attended the U.S. Naval Test Pilot School from 1993 to 1994. He has logged more than 5,000 hours in more than 50 different aircraft and has over 375 carrier landings.

Kelly has received two Defense Superior Service Medals; one Legion of Merit; two Distinguished Flying Crosses; four Air Medals (two individual/two strike flight) with Combat "V"; two Navy Commendation Medals, (one with combat "V"); one Navy Achievement Medal; two Southwest Asia Service Medals; one Navy Expeditionary Medal; two Sea Service Deployment Ribbons; a NASA Distinguished Service Medal; and an Overseas Service Ribbon.

On June 21, 2011, Kelly announced his retirement from the U.S. Navy and NASA, effective October 1, 2011. His retirement was announced on his Facebook page, where he wrote, "Words cannot convey my deep gratitude for the opportunities I have been given to serve our great nation. From the day I entered the United States Merchant Marine Academy in the summer of 1982 to the moment I landed the Space Shuttle Endeavour three weeks ago, it has been my privilege to advance the ideals that define the United States of America."

NASA career

NASA selected both Mark and Scott Kelly to be Space Shuttle pilots in 1996. They joined the NASA Astronaut Corps in August of that year. Mark Kelly has logged over 54 days in space. During his 2006 flight on Space Shuttle Discovery, the second mission after the loss of Space Shuttle Columbia, Kelly discussed the risks of flying the Space Shuttle:

Spaceflight experience

STS-108

Kelly's first trip into space was as pilot of STS-108. After several delays, Endeavour lifted off on December 5, 2001, on the final Shuttle mission of 2001.

STS-108 Endeavour visited the ISS, delivering over three tons of equipment, supplies, and a fresh crew to the orbiting outpost. The hatches were opened between Endeavour and the ISS Destiny Laboratory on December 7, enabling the 10 crew members to greet one another. The Expedition 3 crew officially ended their 117-day residency on board the ISS on December 8 as their custom Soyuz seat-liners were transferred to Endeavour for the return trip home. The transfer of the Expedition 4 seat-liners to the Soyuz return vehicle attached to the station marked the official exchange of crews.

Kelly and Mission Specialist Linda Godwin used the shuttle's robotic arm to lift the Raffaello Multi-Purpose Logistics Module from the shuttle payload bay and attach it to a berth on the station's Unity node. The crews began unloading supplies the same day. Mission managers extended Endeavour's flight duration to 12 days to allow the crew to assist with additional maintenance tasks on the station, including work on a treadmill and replacing a failed compressor in one of the air conditioners in the Zvezda Service Module. A change of command ceremony took place on December 13 as Expedition 3 ended and Expedition 4 began. STS-108 returned to Earth with the previous ISS crew of three men.

Kelly traveled over 4.8 million miles and orbited the Earth 186 times over 11 days and 19+ hours.

STS-121

In July 2006, Kelly piloted STS-121 Discovery, the second "Return to Flight" mission following the loss of Columbia in February 2003. Because of weather delays, STS-121 became the first shuttle mission to launch on the Fourth of July.

The mission's main purposes were to test new safety and repair techniques introduced after the Columbia disaster and to deliver supplies, equipment, and European Space Agency (ESA) astronaut Thomas Reiter from Germany to the ISS. Reiter's transfer returned the ISS to a three-member staffing level.

During the STS-121 mission to the ISS, the crew of Discovery continued to test new equipment and procedures for the inspection and repair of the thermal protection system that is designed to increase the shuttles' safety. It also delivered more supplies and cargo for future ISS expansion.

After the Columbia accident, NASA decided that two test flights would be required and that activities originally assigned to STS-114 would need to be divided into two missions because of the addition of post-Columbia safety tests.

Gabby Giffords, Kelly's girlfriend at the time, picked one of the mission's wake-up songs, U2's "Beautiful Day".

Kelly traveled over 5.28 million miles and orbited the Earth 202 times over 12 days and 18+ hours.

STS-124

STS-124 Discovery was Kelly's first mission as commander. A month before liftoff, he discussed what being a shuttle commander entailed and how it was different from his previous missions:

The mission was the second of three shuttle missions to carry components of Japan's Kibo laboratory to the ISS. Kibo is Japanese for "hope". The laboratory is Japan's primary contribution to the ISS.

Just before liftoff, Kelly said, "While we've all prepared for this event today, the discoveries from Kibo will definitely offer hope for tomorrow. Now stand by for the greatest show on Earth."

During the launch, Launch Pad 39A sustained substantial damage, more than had been seen on any previous launch. After liftoff, inspectors discovered that bricks and mortar from the launch pad's base had been thrown as far as the perimeter fence, a distance of 1,500 feet (457 m).

Kelly and his crew delivered the pressurized module for Kibo to the ISS. The module is the Kibo laboratory's largest component and the station's largest habitable module. Discovery also delivered Kibo's Remote Manipulator System. It also delivered a replacement part for the station's toilet. The ISS's toilet had been malfunctioning for a week, creating a potentially serious problem for the crew. When Kelly first entered the station, he joked, "You looking for a plumber?"

This mission was the first time a spouse of a member of Congress traveled to space. Kelly traveled over 5.7 million miles, and orbited the Earth 218 times over 13 days and 18 hours.

STS-134

STS-134 launched on May 16, 2011.

On April 29, 2011, the first launch attempt of STS-134 was scrubbed. Giffords traveled to Florida on her first trip since moving from Tucson to Houston in January after an attempted assassination. Her appearance at Kennedy Space Center gave the launch a high profile, "one of the most anticipated in years," according to The New York Times. President Obama visited the Kennedy Space Center on April 29 on a trip with the original intention of watching the Endeavour launch.

Kelly was the commander of the mission which was Space Shuttle Endeavour's last. His crew and he delivered the Alpha Magnetic Spectrometer to the ISS.

Most of the mission's delays were caused by external tank issues on STS-133 Discovery. When Scott Kelly went to the ISS on October 7, 2010, STS-134 was scheduled to go to the station during his mission. The potential rendezvous in space of the Kelly brothers would have been a first meeting of blood relatives in space. The delay of STS-134's launch ended that possibility.

After his wife's shooting, Kelly's status was unclear, but NASA announced on February 4, 2011, that he would remain commander of the mission. The remarkable progress his wife was making in her recovery helped Kelly decide to return to training. Peggy Whitson, chief of the NASA Astronaut Office at the time, said, "we are confident in his ability to successfully lead this mission, and I know I speak for all of NASA in saying 'welcome back.'"

Papal blessing
At 4 pm PDT on May 22, 2011, the European Space Agency and Italian Space Agency arranged for a call to Endeavour by Pope Benedict XVI. During his call—prompted by the discovery of a gash in the Shuttle's fuselage—Benedict extended his blessing to Giffords, who had undergone skull surgery earlier in the week. The event marked the first time a pope spoke to astronauts during a mission.

U2
On June 24, 2011, a recorded message by Kelly from the ISS wished his wife love using song lyrics from David Bowie's "Space Oddity" and introduced U2's song "Beautiful Day" on the first night of the Glastonbury festival in England. A similar message from Kelly aboard the ISS was played during U2's 360° Tour concert stop at various locations. It said: "I'm looking forward to coming home. Tell my wife I love her very much. She knows."

Retirement from NASA
On June 21, 2011, Kelly announced that he would leave NASA's astronaut corps and the U.S. Navy effective October 1. He cited Giffords's needs during her recovery as a reason for his retirement.

Post-NASA career

Author 
In 2011, Kelly and Giffords coauthored Gabby: A Story of Courage, Love and Resilience. The book provides biographical information on the couple and describes in detail the assassination attempt on Giffords and her initial recovery. Written in Kelly's voice, it includes a short note by Giffords at the end.

Kelly's second book, Mousetronaut: Based on a (Partially) True Story (2012), is a children's book illustrated by C. F. Payne. It was a New York Times number one bestseller and was followed the next year by a sequel, Mousetronaut Goes to Mars.

In 2014, Giffords and Kelly coauthored Enough: Our Fight to Keep America Safe from Gun Violence.

In 2015, Kelly and Martha Freeman cowrote Astrotwins: Project Blastoff, a fictional story about twins Scott and Mark who build a space capsule in their grandfather's backyard and try to send the first kid into orbit. Kelly dedicated this book to Scott Kelly. The sequel, Astrotwins—Project Rescue, was published in 2016.

Aerospace work 
Kelly is co-founder and strategic advisor of Tucson-based high-altitude balloon near-space exploration company World View Enterprises. He served as Director of Flight Crew Operations beginning in 2013, and was involved in the development of the new craft, as well as its procedures and operations.

On March 28, 2012, SpaceX announced that Kelly would be part of an independent safety advisory panel composed of leading human spaceflight safety experts.

Political activism 
In January 2013, Kelly and Giffords started a political action committee, Americans for Responsible Solutions. The organization's mission is to promote solutions to gun violence with elected officials and the general public. The couple say it supports the Second Amendment while promoting responsible gun ownership and "keeping guns out of the hands of dangerous people like criminals, terrorists, and the mentally ill." The group claims that "current gun laws allow private sellers to sell guns without a background check, creating a loophole that provides criminals and the mentally ill easy access to guns". On March 31, 2013, Kelly said, "any bill that does not include a universal background check is a mistake. It's the most common-sense thing we can do to prevent criminals and the mentally ill from having access to weapons." In 2016, Americans for Responsible Solutions joined the Law Center to Prevent Gun Violence and launched a joint organization known as "Giffords".

U.S. Senate

Elections

2020 special

On February 12, 2019, Kelly announced that he would run as a Democrat in the 2020 United States Senate special election in Arizona. Kelly looked to unseat incumbent Republican Martha McSally, a fellow veteran who was appointed to the position shortly after losing the 2018 Senate election to Democrat Kyrsten Sinema. The seat was vacated upon John McCain's death on August 25, 2018, and held by Governor Doug Ducey's appointee Jon Kyl until Kyl resigned on December 31, 2018. Kelly declined to accept campaign contributions from corporate political action committees (PACs), but did accept thousands of dollars in campaign contributions from corporate executives and lobbyists.

The Associated Press called the race for Kelly on November 4, 2020. His election marks the first time since 1953 that Arizona has had two Democratic senators. As the election was a special election, Kelly took office during the 116th Congress, shortly after Arizona certified its election results on November 30, unlike other senators and representatives elected in 2020, who took office at the opening of the 117th Congress on January 3, 2021. Kelly was sworn in at noon on December 2.

Kelly is the fourth retired astronaut to be elected to Congress, after John Glenn, Harrison Schmitt, and Jack Swigert.

2022 

Kelly won reelection in the November 2022 general election, defeating Republican challenger Blake Masters.

Tenure 

On December 2, 2020, Kelly cast his first Senate vote, a "no" vote on the nomination of Kathryn C. Davis to the United States Court of Federal Claims. On December 9, Kelly voted "no" on a resolution blocking President Donald Trump from selling $23 billion in drones to the United Arab Emirates. Kelly split his vote by voting yes on another resolution blocking F-35 sales to the UAE. Both resolutions failed.

In the wake of the January 6 United States Capitol attack, Kelly expressed support for Vice President Mike Pence and Trump's cabinet invoking the Twenty-fifth Amendment to the United States Constitution to remove Trump from office. He voted to convict in Trump's second impeachment trial, along with 56 other senators.

Committee assignments 
Committee on Armed Services
Subcommittee on Airland
Subcommittee on Emerging Threats and Capabilities (Chairman)
Committee on Energy and Natural Resources
Subcommittee on National Parks
Subcommittee on Public Lands, Forests, and Mining
Subcommittee on Water and Power
Committee on Environment and Public Works
Subcommittee on Chemical Safety, Waste Management, Environmental Justice, and Regulatory Oversight
Subcommittee on Fisheries, Water, and Wildlife
Subcommittee on Transportation and Infrastructure
Special Committee on Aging
Joint Economic Committee

Political positions 
Kelly ran as a moderate in 2020 and voiced support for bipartisanship. Since joining the Senate, he supported abolishing the filibuster in order to pass voting rights legislation and a federal minimum wage increase to $15 per hour. He has criticized Joe Biden's approach to border security. As of October 2022, Kelly has voted in line with Biden's stated position 94.5% of the time.

Abortion
As a candidate in 2020, Kelly said he was "pro-choice" and was endorsed by Planned Parenthood. He supports codifying Roe v. Wade into federal law. He has said that late-stage abortions should be legally protected.

Climate and environment 
Kelly has voiced support for climate action, but said he "does not favor" the Green New Deal. The League of Conservation Voters gave him a 97% score in 2021. In 2022, Kelly also advocated for an expansion of oil drilling in the wake of rising gas prices.

Guns
Kelly became an outspoken advocate for gun control following the attempted assassination of his wife, former U.S. Representative Gabby Giffords, at the 2011 Tucson shooting.

Kelly voted for the Bipartisan Safer Communities Act in response to the Robb Elementary School shooting in Uvalde, Texas.

Health care
Kelly supports building on the Affordable Care Act to include a public health insurance option.

Immigration
Of the Deferred Action for Childhood Arrivals (DACA) program, Kelly has said, "Dreamers are as American as anyone", and has expressed support for it.

Trump administration
In February 2021, Kelly voted to convict Trump for incitement of insurrection in his second impeachment trial, and has been outspoken in his disdain for him.

Personal life
Kelly married Amelia Victoria Babis on January 7, 1989. They divorced in 2004. They have two daughters, Claudia and Claire Kelly.

Kelly married U.S. Representative Gabby Giffords of Tucson, Arizona, on November 10, 2007, in a ceremony presided over by Rabbi Stephanie Aaron, and attended by his STS-124 shuttle crew and former Secretary of Labor Robert Reich. Reich toasted: "To a bride who moves at a velocity that exceeds that of anyone else in Washington, and a groom who moves at a velocity that exceeds 17,000 miles per hour." The couple met on a 2003 trip to China as part of a trade mission sponsored by the National Committee on U.S.–China Relations.

At the time of their marriage, Kelly lived in Houston, Texas, and said that the longest stretch of time the two had spent together was a couple of weeks. He said that they did not plan to always live that way, but that it was what they were used to. He added, "It teaches you not to sweat the small stuff."

Shooting in Tucson

Giffords was shot in an assassination attempt on January 8, 2011, putting Kelly in the national spotlight. On February 4, Kelly described the previous month as the hardest time of his life and expressed his gratitude for the enormous outpouring of support, good wishes and prayers for his wife. He said that he believed people's prayers for her helped.

One of Giffords's aides informed Kelly of the shooting almost immediately after it happened. He flew from Houston to Tucson with members of his family. En route, the Kellys received an erroneous news report that Giffords had died. "The kids, Claudia and Claire, started crying. My mother, she almost screamed. I just walked into the bathroom, and, you know, broke down." Calling family in Tucson, Kelly found out that the report was false and that she was alive and in surgery. "It was a terrible mistake," Kelly said. "As bad as it was that she had died, it's equally exciting that she hadn't."

From the time he arrived in Tucson, Kelly sat vigil at his wife's bedside as she struggled to survive and began to recover. As her condition began to improve, the Kelly-Giffords family researched options for rehabilitation facilities and chose one in Houston. On January 21, Giffords was transferred to the Memorial Hermann–Texas Medical Center, where she spent five days before moving to TIRR Memorial Hermann, where she continued her recovery and rehabilitation.

Giffords and Kelly had spoken dozens of times about how risky her job was. She was afraid that someone with a gun would come up to her at a public event. In an interview filmed just over a week after the shooting, Kelly said, "She has Tombstone, Arizona, in her district, the town that's too tough to die. Gabrielle Giffords is too tough to let this beat her."

Aftermath

A memorial service for those killed in the assassination attempt was held on January 12, 2011, at the University of Arizona. President Obama flew to Tucson to speak at the memorial. Kelly sat between First Lady Michelle Obama and Secretary of Homeland Security Janet Napolitano, the former governor of Arizona. At the end of the service, Obama consoled and embraced him, after which Kelly returned to the hospital to be with his wife.

Kelly spoke on February 3, 2011, at the National Prayer Breakfast in Washington, DC. His remarks closed the event, where Obama also spoke. Kelly said the attack on his wife brought him closer to God and gave him a newfound awareness regarding prayer. He said that before the attack, "I thought the world just spins and the clock just ticks and things happen for no particular reason", but that, in Tucson, as he found himself wandering in makeshift memorials and shrines filled with Bibles and angels, "You pray where you are. You pray when God is there in your heart." Kelly offered the final prayer of the morning. The prayer was from Rabbi Stephanie Aaron, who married Kelly and Giffords, and who said the same words over Giffords on the night of the shooting:

In 2011, Kelly said he believed there was a chance to change a political environment he believed was too vitriolic. He hoped that the tragedy would be an opportunity to improve the tone of the national dialogue and cool down the rhetoric. In response to a question on February 4, 2011, about civility in politics, Kelly said, "I haven't spent a lot of time following that, but I think that with something that was so horrible and so negative, and the fact that six people lost their lives including a nine-year-old girl, a federal judge, Gabby's staff member Gabe—who was like a younger brother to her—it's really, really a sad situation. I am hopeful that something positive can come out of it. I think that will happen, so those are good things."

Electoral history

Awards and decorations 
Kelly's awards and decorations include:

References

Further reading
 Interview with Discovery crew, July 11, 2006
 Launch of STS-124 Discovery, May 31, 2008, includes link to video of launch
 Statement from Mark Kelly, January 10, 2011, Kelly's first public statement after the shooting of his wife
 Kelly's Interview with Diane Sawyer, January 2011, ABC News video
 Kelly's remarks at the National Prayer Breakfast, February 3, 2011, CBS News video.
 Kelly to Fly on Shuttle Mission, February 4, 2011, NASA Press Conference with Mark Kelly, Peggy Whitson and Brent Jett, NASA TV

External links

 Senator Mark Kelly official U.S. Senate website
 Mark Kelly for U.S. Senate  campaign website
 
 

|-

|-

1964 births
21st-century American non-fiction writers
American astronaut-politicians
American gun control activists
20th-century American memoirists
American people of Irish descent
American test pilots
Arizona Democrats
Democratic Party United States senators from Arizona
Gabby Giffords
Identical twins
Living people
Military personnel from New Jersey
Naval Postgraduate School alumni
People from West Orange, New Jersey
Recipients of the Air Medal
Recipients of the Defense Superior Service Medal
Recipients of the Distinguished Flying Cross (United States)
Recipients of the Legion of Merit
Recipients of the NASA Distinguished Service Medal
Recipients of the NASA Exceptional Service Medal
Space Shuttle program astronauts
Spouses of Arizona politicians
American twins
United States Merchant Marine Academy alumni
United States Naval Aviators
United States Naval Test Pilot School alumni
United States Navy astronauts
United States Navy captains
United States Navy personnel of the Gulf War
West Orange High School (New Jersey) alumni
Writers from New Jersey